Fatima Khel Kalan is a town and union council of Bannu District in the Khyber Pakhtunkhwa of Pakistan.

References

Union councils of Bannu District
Populated places in Bannu District